The Monolith is a pair of small islets located off the southern tip of Sabrina Island within the Ross Dependency of Antarctica.

References

 Islands of Antarctica